High Class in Borrowed Shoes is the second album by Canadian rock band Max Webster. The album was released in 1977 and has been certified gold by the Canadian Recording Industry Association. 

This album was released in the US and Europe on the Mercury Records label.

Track listing
All songs written by Kim Mitchell & Pye Dubois, except where noted.
Side one
 "High Class in Borrowed Shoes" – 4:00
 "Diamonds Diamonds" – 3:18
 "Gravity" – 4:53
 "Words to Words" – 3:34
 "America's Veins" – 4:08

Side two
 "Oh War! – 4:25
 "On the Road" – 3:25
 "Rain Child" (Terry Watkinson) – 4:22 
 "In Context of the Moon" – 5:13

Personnel
All credits adapted from the original release.
Max Webster
Kim Mitchell – guitars and lead vocals
Terry Watkinson – keyboards, vocals and lead vocals on "Rain Child"
Mike Tilka – bass guitar, ARP bass and vocals
Gary McCracken – drums and percussion
Pye Dubois – lyrics

Production
Terry Brown – producer, engineer, mixing
Ken Morris – assistant engineer
Hugh Syme – album design and cover illustration
Bob King – album design
David Street – photography
Tom Berry – executive producer

References

External links
 "High Class In Borrowed Shoes" at discogs; click on "more images" for publishing

1977 albums
Max Webster albums
Anthem Records albums
Albums produced by Terry Brown (record producer)
Mercury Records albums